The following is a list of nicknames, aliases, sobriquets and slogans for municipalities and unincorporated communities in the U.S. state of Washington.

City nicknames can help in establishing a civic identity, helping outsiders recognize a community or attracting people to a community because of its nickname; promote civic pride; and build community unity. Nicknames and slogans that successfully create a new community "ideology or myth" are also believed to have economic value. Their economic value is difficult to measure, but there are anecdotal reports of cities that have achieved substantial economic benefits by "branding" themselves by adopting new slogans.

This list includes both official and unofficial nicknames. Some of the nicknames that were used historically may no longer be in use.
Aberdeen – Port of Missing Men
Algona – City of the Great Blue Heron
Auburn – More Than You Imagined
Bellevue – City in a Park
Bellingham
City of Subdued Excitement
Let Us Surprise You
Blaine – The Peace Arch City
Bothell – For a Day or a Lifetime
Burien – B-Town
Burlington – The Hub City
Chehalis – Rose City
Chewelah – Place For All Seasons
Colville – Washington's Most Livable Community
Cosmopolis – City of the World
Enumclaw – The Gateway to Mount Rainier
Everett – Milltown, City of Smokestacks 
Forks – The Logging Capital of the World
Gig Harbor – The Maritime City
Ilwaco – By Land or By Sea
Kelso
City of Friendly People
Smelt Capital of the World
Kirkland
Gateway to Seattle (adopted in 1926)
The Little City that Could
Lynden – The Gem City
Marysville – The Strawberry City
Morton – Home of the Loggers Jubilee
Mount Vernon – The City of Tulips 
Olympia  
Oly
The Town (The original city nicknamed The Town) 
Port Townsend, Washington  - The Key City; The City of Dreams
Poulsbo – Little Norway
Pullman – Lentil Capital
Puyallup – The Land of Generous People
Redmond – Bicycle Capital of the Northwest
Richland
The Windy Town 
City Of the Bombers
Atomic City
Seattle
City of Flowers (adopted in the 1940s)
Emerald City: official since 1982
Jet City: for the prominence of the aerospace industry, especially Boeing.
Queen City (of the Pacific Northwest): official from 1869–1982Nard Jones remarked in his 1972 book Seattle (Doubleday), p. 354, that the nickname was "almost abandoned now because of a homosexual twist of semantics".
Sea-Town
Sedro-Woolley – Gateway to the North Cascades
Sequim – Sunny Sequim
Spokane – The Lilac City
Sumner – Rhubarb Pie CapitalClaims to Fame - Food , Epodunk, accessed April 16, 2007.
Tacoma 
America’s #1 Wired City
The City of Destiny – Applied in 1873 when Tacoma was the terminus for the Northern Pacific Railroad.Jeff Larsen, Short Trips: Revitalized city catches up to its destiny, Seattle Post-Intelligencer, March 13, 2003
Tackyoma
T-Town
Grit City 
Tumwater – Green Town
Walla Walla – The City was so Nice, They Named it Twice
Wenatchee – Apple Capital of the World.
White Center – Rat City
White Salmon – The Land Where the Sun Meets the Rain
Yakima – The Palm Springs of Washington

See also
 List of city nicknames in the United States
 List of cities in Washington
 List of towns in Washington
 List of census-designated places in Washington
 List of unincorporated communities in Washington

References

Washington cities and towns
Populated places in Washington (state)
City nicknames